Toshio Yamano (born 15 July 1937) is a Japanese diver. He competed at the 1960 Summer Olympics and the 1964 Summer Olympics.

References

External links
 
 

1937 births
Living people
Japanese male divers
Olympic divers of Japan
Divers at the 1960 Summer Olympics
Divers at the 1964 Summer Olympics
Place of birth missing (living people)
Asian Games medalists in diving
Divers at the 1958 Asian Games
Medalists at the 1958 Asian Games
Asian Games silver medalists for Japan
20th-century Japanese people